Crescent Mountain is a 6,715-ft (2,047 m) ridge-like mountain located in north-central Mount Rainier National Park, in Pierce County of Washington state. It is part of the Cascade Range, and lies  due north of the summit of Mount Rainier. Sluiskin Mountain is its nearest higher neighbor,  to the east. Precipitation runoff from Crescent Mountain drains west into tributaries of the Carbon River.

History
This mountain's descriptive name Crescent derives from its crescent shape as it wraps around Crescent Lake. This feature was named by geologist Bailey Willis in 1883. The name was officially adopted in 1932 by the United States Board on Geographic Names.

Climate

Crescent Mountain is located in the marine west coast climate zone of western North America. Most weather fronts originate in the Pacific Ocean, and travel northeast toward the Cascade Mountains. As fronts approach, they are forced upward by the peaks of the Cascade Range (Orographic lift), causing them to drop their moisture in the form of rain or snowfall onto the Cascades. As a result, the west side of the Cascades experiences high precipitation, especially during the winter months in the form of snowfall. During winter months, weather is usually cloudy, but, due to high pressure systems over the Pacific Ocean that intensify during summer months, there is often little or no cloud cover during the summer. The months July through September offer the most favorable weather for viewing or climbing this peak.

See also

 Geology of the Pacific Northwest

References

External links
 National Park Service web site: Mount Rainier National Park
 Crescent Mountain: weather forecast

Cascade Range
Mountains of Pierce County, Washington
Mountains of Washington (state)
Mount Rainier National Park
North American 2000 m summits